Higher Learning Vol.2 is a mixtape by American hip hop recording artist Fashawn, released on February 16, 2011. The mixtape is hosted by DJ Ill Will and DJ Rockstar, and presented by XXL Magazine. It features 22 tracks with appearances by J. Cole, GOOD Music artist GLC, Tony Williams, Sam Hook, Gilbere Forte, and more.

The mixtape is particularly known for J. Cole's contributions, which included two vocal appearances and three production credits. Following the mixtape's release, Fashawn embarked on the Higher Learning Tour with Evidence and Del the Funky Homosapien.

On May 25, 2011, a music video was released for the song "Down That Road", featuring Sam Cooke and produced by Nemis. On June 22, 2011, a music video was released for the song "Big Dreams", produced by J. Cole.

Track listing

References

External links
Fashawn - "Higher Learning, Vol. 2" on iTunes
Fashawn Official Website
Fashawn on Twitter 
Fashawn on Instagram 

2011 mixtape albums
Fashawn albums
Albums produced by J. Cole
Albums produced by J Dilla
Albums produced by RZA
Sequel albums